Alexander Placheta (born 22 September 1967) is an Austrian freestyle swimmer. He competed in two events at the 1988 Summer Olympics.

References

External links
 

1967 births
Living people
Austrian male freestyle swimmers
Olympic swimmers of Austria
Swimmers at the 1988 Summer Olympics
Place of birth missing (living people)